Nathalie Richard (born 6 January 1963) is a French actress.

Life and career
Richard was born in Paris, France. As a child, Nathalie Richard practised dance and ice-skating. She spent a year in New York with the Karole Armitage company, returning to join the Conservatoire national supérieur d'art dramatique graduating in 1986 since when she has worked regularly in both cinema and theatre.

In 2018, alongside Liza Blanchard she took one of the principal roles in the staging of Anne Théron, created at the TNS of the play À la trace of Alexandra Badea which explores mother-daughter relations. The performance, in dialogue with pre-recorded audio-visual projections, was lauded by the press., breaking down the barriers between theatre and film.

She received the Prix Michel Simon film prize for most promising actress/actor for her role in the 1988 Jacques Rivette film Gang of Four.

Filmography
Une zone à défendre (2023) - Severine
Neneh Superstar (2022) - Jeanne-Marie Meursault
Irma Vep (2022 TV mini-series) - Ondine
After Love (2020) - Genevieve
Ma vie avec James Dean (2017, Dominique Choisy) Sylvia van den Rood (her third film for Choisy)
Les Garçons sauvages - teacher
Happy End (2017) - estate agent
The Great Game (2015) - Pauline
Jeune and Jolie (2013, François Ozon) - Véronique
Violette (2013) - Hermine
Les Fraises des bois (2012, Dominique Choisy) - the mother
Never Let Me Go (2010) - Madame
Une petite zone de turbulences (2009) - Psychiatrist
Le Plaisir de chanter (2008 by Ilan Duran Cohen) - Noémie
Parc (2007) - Hélène Clou
Le Pressentiment (2006 by Jean-Pierre Darroussin) - Gabrielle Charmes-Aicquart
The Passenger (2005, by Eric Caravaca) - Suzanne
Belhorizon (2005) - Isabelle
3 femmes... un soir d'été (2005 TV mini-series) - Isabelle
Zim and Co. (2005) - La mère de Zim
Hidden (2005, by Michael Haneke) - Mathilde
Les enfants (2005) - Hélène
Les visages (2003 short)
Le Divorce (2003, Merchant Ivory Film) - Charlotte de Persand
La chaîne du froid (2003 short) - Client
Le ventre de Juliette (2003) - Fafa
Merci Docteur Rey (2002, Merchant Ivory Film) - Radio Interviewer
Froid comme l'été (2002 TV movie) - Claire
Nearest to Heaven (2002) - Brigitte
Novo (2002) - Sabine
Étrangère (2002) - La serveuse
Maintenant (2002 short) - Else
Imago (2001) - Marianne
Mon meilleur amour (2001 short) - Corinne
L'hiver sera rude (2001) - Solange
They Call This... Spring (2001) - A naiad
Confusion of Genders (2000) - Laurence Albertini
30 Years (2000) - Barbara
Pretend I'm Not Here (2000) - Carole
Modern Comforts (2000, Dominique Choisy) - Irène
Code Unknown (2000, by Michael Haneke) - Mathilde
Scénario sur la drogue (2000 short) - (segment "Famille médicament, La")
La famille médicament (2000 short) - La mère
Afraid of Everything (1999) - Anne
Bruno n'a pas d'agent (1999 short)
Le pourboire (ou la pitié) (1999 short) - Béatrice
Les Enfants de Scarlett (1998) - Kate
Late August, Early September (1998) - Maryelle
A Soldier's Daughter Never Cries (1998, Merchant Ivory Film) - Mademoiselle Fournier
Stolen Life (1998, Yves Angelo) - Yann's wife
La vie en face (1997 TV movie) - Claire
Eau douce (1997) - Marianne
Irma Vep (1996, Olivier Assayas) - Zoé
L'éducatrice (1996) - Louise
51 raisons (1996 short)
Youth Without God (1996 TV movie)
Up, Down, Fragile (1995, by Jacques Rivette) - Ninon
Le Soleil a promis de se lever demain (1995 short)
Lumière and Company (1995, segment Jacques Rivette) - Ninon
Les amoureux (1994, Catherine Corsini) - Viviane
Jeanne la Pucelle II - Les prisons (1994, by Jacques Rivette) - Catherine de la Rochelle(short cut version in not included her scene)
Comme un dimanche (1994 short)
Grand bonheur (1993) - Charly
Légendes de la forêt viennoise (1993 TV movie)
Le linge sale (1993 short)
Riens du tout (1992) - Claire
Interdit d'amour (1992 TV movie) - Mme Brémont
Weep No More, My Lady (1992 TV movie) - Alicia
C'est trop con! (1992 short) - Jeanne
Cendrillon 90 (1991 short)
Bar des rails (1991) - Monique, the waitress
Monsieur (1990) - L'hôtesse d'accueil
Les dernières heures du millénaire (1990 short)
Winter's Child (1989) - Leni
La Jalousie (1989 short)
Constance (1989 short)
La bande des quatre (1988, by Jacques Rivette) - Cécile
Prix Michel Simon 1989 (for Most Promising Actress)
Le Panorama (1987 short)
Window Shopping (1986, by Chantal Akerman) - La coiffeuse #6

References

External links

Allociné

1963 births
French film actresses
Living people
Actresses from Paris
20th-century French actresses
21st-century French actresses
French television actresses
French stage actresses